The Management College of Southern Africa (MANCOSA) is an education institution located in Durban, South Africa. It is a private higher education institution,  established in 1995 as a post-apartheid empowerment institution, offering affordable and accessible management education primarily to persons previously denied access to postgraduate education. In 2017, it joined Honoris United Universities.
From 2002, MANCOSA publishers the Journal of Management & Administration.

Programmes
MANCOSA offers programs for business administration, commerce, functional management and leadership. It confers certifications ranging from certificates to master's degrees. With over 10,000 students currently registered, it is one of the largest providers of management programmes through supported distance learning in Southern Africa.

Management
In 2002 it received Full Institutional Accreditation from the Higher Education Quality Committee (HEQC), the quality assuring committee of the Council on Higher Education (CHE); its programmes are registered on the South African Qualifications Authority's National Qualifications Framework (NQF). In 2017 MANCOSA joined Honoris United Universities alongside educational institutions in the countries of Tunisia (IMSET, ESPRIT), Morocco (EMSI), Mauritius (Honoris Educational Network), South Africa (Regent Business School), Zimbabwe, and Zambia.

Notable alumni
 Doreen Sioka, Namibian Minister of Labour and Social Welfare
 Alistair Mokoena, chief executive officer, Ogilvy South Africa
 Ayanda Dlodlo, RSA Minister of State Security Minister
 Gwede Mantashe, South African politician and trade unionist
 Tjekero Tweya, Namibia Minister of Industrialisation, Trade and SME Development
 Leevi Shiimi Katoma, Namibian Member of Parliament
 Evelyn !Nawases-Taeyele, Namibian Member of Parliament

References

External links
 Official site

Distance education institutions based in South Africa
Business schools in South Africa